MFI or M.F.I. may refer to:

Companies and organizations
 MFI Foundation Inc., non-profit science foundation in the Philippines
 MFI Group, British furniture retailer
 Media Factory, Inc., anime company
 Messiah Foundation International, a spiritual organization 
 Microfinance institution, alternate form of bank in developing countries which provides microcredit lending
 MindFreedom International, group that fights involuntary therapy
 Ministers Fellowship International, fellowship of non-denominational charismatic churches
 Missionary Flights International, a religious charity providing aviation support with DC-3 aircraft

Other
 MFi Program, "Made for iPhone/iPod/iPad", a licensing program for developers of hardware and software for Apple products
 Magnetic field imaging, a noninvasive and contact-free cardiac diagnostic method
 Melt flow index,  a measure of the ease of flow of the melt of a thermoplastic polymer
 Micromechanical Flying Insect, ornithopter robot that flies based on insect flight technique
 Mikoyan Project 1.44, MiG-MFI, Russian fighter aircraft project (cancelled)
 Minimum Fisher information, variational principle in information theory
 Money flow index, indicator in technical analysis